Herman S. Brookman (July 2, 1891 — November 6, 1973) was an architect in Portland, Oregon, United States.

Born in New York, Brookman received early training in the office of society architect Harrie T. Lindeberg and worked there until 1923. He was influenced by Edwin Lutyens and was a noted perfectionist. Brookman came to Oregon in 1923 at the request of client Lloyd Frank, and spent the rest of his career there before retiring to California.  Noted Portland architect John Yeon trained in his office. The 1926 Bitar Mansion designed by Brookman was put up for sale in 2006.

Work 

Brookman's work (in Portland, unless otherwise noted) includes:

 Commodore Hotel (1925)
 M. Lloyd Frank Estate (1926; now the site of Lewis & Clark College)
 Bitar Mansion (1926)
 Menucha, the Julius Meier estate in Corbett, Oregon (circa 1926)
 Temple Beth Israel (1926-1928; with Morris H. Whitehouse and Harry A. Herzog)
 Victor H. and Marta Jorgensen House (1929)
 Baruh–Zell House (1937)
 Grace Kern House (1955)
 Alan and Barbara Goldsmith House (1959)

References

External links
Guide to the Herman Brookman Architecture Files circa 1923-1940s
 Herman Brookman photographs, c. 1923-1940s Historic Photograph Collections, University of Oregon

1891 births
1973 deaths
Architects from Portland, Oregon
Fellows of the American Institute of Architects